François-Joseph Hunauld (24 February 1701 – 15 December 1742) was a French anatomist born in Châteaubriant.

In 1722 he received his medical degree at Reims, then continued his studies in Paris under Jacques Bénigne Winslow (1669–1760) and Guichard Joseph Duverney (1648–1730). In 1724 he became a member of the Académie des sciences. In 1730 he succeeded Duverney as instructor of anatomy at the Jardin du Roi, a position he kept until his death in 1742. He died in Paris.

He is remembered for his work in the field of  a significant anatomical museum. Many of his writings were published in the Mémoires de l’Académie des sciences.

Selected writings 
 Dissertation en forme de lettres au sujet des ouvrages de l’auteur du livre sur les maladies des os, 1726.
 Discours sur les fièvres qui ont régné les années dernières.
 Nouveau traité de physique sur toute la nature, (two volumes) 1742.

References 
 François-Joseph Hunauld @ Who Named It
 The General Biographical Dictionary by Alexander Chalmers
 Access My Library Thoracic outlet syndrome: a 50-year experience at Baylor University Medical Center

1701 births
1742 deaths
People from Châteaubriant
French anatomists
Members of the French Academy of Sciences